Jin Liangkuan (born 28 January 2002) is a Chinese footballer currently playing as a defender for Guangzhou City.

Career statistics

Club
.

References

2002 births
Living people
Chinese footballers
Association football defenders
Chinese Super League players
Guangzhou City F.C. players